Sand Church may refer to:

Sand Church (Innlandet), a church in Nord-Odal municipality in Innlandet county, Norway
Sand Church (Nordland), a church in Hadsel municipality in Nordland county, Norway
Sand Church (Rogaland), a church in Suldal municipality in Rogaland county, Norway

See also
Sanda Church, Gotland, Sweden
Sande Church (disambiguation), a list of similarly named churches